Princess and Landgravine Christiane Amalie of Hesse-Homburg, full German name: Christiane Amalie, Landgräfin von Hessen-Homburg (29 June 1774, Bad Homburg vor der Höhe, Landgraviate of Hesse-Homburg, Holy Roman Empire – 3 February 1846, Dessau, Duchy of Anhalt-Dessau) was a member of the House of Hesse-Homburg and a Princess and Landgravine of Hesse-Homburg by birth. Through her marriage to Frederick, Hereditary Prince of Anhalt-Dessau, Amalie was also a member of the House of Ascania and Hereditary Princess of Anhalt-Dessau.

Family
Amalie was the fifth child of Frederick V, Landgrave of Hesse-Homburg and his wife Princess Caroline of Hesse-Darmstadt, daughter of Louis IX, Landgrave of Hesse-Darmstadt.

Marriage and issue
Amalie married Frederick, Hereditary Prince of Anhalt-Dessau, only surviving child of Leopold III, Duke of Anhalt-Dessau and his wife Margravine Louise Henriette Wilhelmine of Brandenburg-Schwedt, on 12 June 1792 in Bad Homburg vor der Höhe, Landgraviate of Hesse-Homburg, Holy Roman Empire. Amalie and Frederick had seven children:

Amalie Auguste of Anhalt-Dessau (b. Dessau, 18 August 1793 - d. Rudolstadt, 12 June 1854), married on 15 April 1816 to Friedrich Günther, Prince of Schwarzburg-Rudolstadt.
Leopold IV Frederick, Duke of Anhalt-Dessau (b. Dessau, 1 October 1794 - d. Dessau, 22 May 1871); since 1863 Duke of all Anhalt.
George Bernhard of Anhalt-Dessau (b. Dessau, 21 February 1796 - d. Dresden, 16 October 1865)
Paul Christian of Anhalt-Dessau (b. Dessau, 22 March 1797 - d. Dessau, 4 May 1797)
Louise Fredericka of Anhalt-Dessau (b. Dessau, 1 March 1798 - d. Homburg, 11 June 1858), a deaf-mute from birth; married on 12 February 1818 to her maternal uncle Gustav, Landgrave of Hesse-Homburg.
Frederick Augustus of Anhalt-Dessau (b. Dessau, 23 September 1799 - d. Dessau, 4 December 1864).
William Waldemar of Anhalt-Dessau (b. Dessau, 29 May 1807 - d. Vienna, 8 October 1864), married morganatically on 9 July 1840 to Emilie Klausnitzer (b. Dessau, 30 January 1812 - d. Vienna, 28 March 1888), created Freifrau von Stolzenberg in 1842.

The poet Friedrich Hölderlin dedicated his 1800 poem Aus stillem Hauße senden - An eine Fürstin von Dessau to the Hereditary Princess.

Ancestry

References

Jan Andres: Auf Poesie ist die Sicherheit der Throne gegründet S. 89 ff.

1774 births
1846 deaths
House of Hesse-Homburg
House of Ascania
Landgravines of Germany
People from Bad Homburg vor der Höhe
Royal reburials
Daughters of monarchs